These are the list of Bhojpuri language films that are scheduled to release in 2023.

January–March

April – June

July – September

October – December

References 

2023
Bhojpuri, 2023
Lists of 2023 films by country or language
2023 in Indian cinema